New Mill End is a hamlet located in Bedfordshire, England, close to county border with Hertfordshire. It is in the civil parish of Hyde, Bedfordshire

New Mill End was the location of Chiltern Green railway station which opened in 1868. The station closed in 1952, however the station buildings survive to this day as a private home.

Hamlets in Bedfordshire
Central Bedfordshire District